Early Olympic Games allowed for individuals in a team to be from different nations.  The International Olympic Committee (IOC) now groups their results together under the mixed team designation (IOC code ZZX).  At the 1896 Summer Olympics, two of three of the medalling pairs in the doubles event in tennis were of mixed nationality.

Medalists

References

  (Digitally available at )
  (Excerpt available at )
 

Nations at the 1896 Summer Olympics
1896